Black Liberation and Palestine Solidarity is a collection of essays by Lenni Brenner and Matthew Quest, published in 2013. The essays discuss the response of African-American freedom movements to the State of Israel and American Middle East policy.

References

Books about Israel
2013 non-fiction books
Anti-racism
Anti-imperialism
Black Power
Palestinian solidarity movement
Essay collections